The banded fruit dove or black-backed fruit dove  (Ptilinopus cinctus) is a large (38–44 cm in length, 450-570 g in weight) pigeon with white head, neck and upper breast; black back and upperwing grading to grey on rump; black tail with broad grey terminal band; underparts grey, demarcated from white head.

Distribution and habitat
The banded fruit dove is found in Bali, and Lesser Sunda Islands. Its habitat is in monsoonal rainforest.

Behaviour and ecology

Breeding
It lays a single egg on an open platform of sticks in a forest tree.

Feeding
It eats fruit from forest trees, especially figs.

References

 BirdLife International. (2006). Species factsheet: Ptilinopus cinctus. Downloaded from https://www.webcitation.org/5QE8rvIqH?url=http://www.birdlife.org/ on 1 February 2007
 Higgins, P.J.; & Davies, S.J.J.F. (Eds.). (1996). Handbook of Australian, New Zealand and Antarctic Birds. Volume 3. Snipe to Pigeons. Oxford University Press: Melbourne. 

banded fruit dove
Birds of the Lesser Sunda Islands
banded fruit dove